Olds-Didsbury-Three Hills is a provincial electoral district in Alberta, Canada. The district is one of 87 districts mandated to return a single member (MLA) to the Legislative Assembly of Alberta using the first past the post method of voting.

This riding in south-central Alberta stretches from the Red Deer River in the east to the area around Cremona in the west. Agriculture is the major employer, with retail a distant second. Household incomes, at $53,174, are below the Alberta average. Seven per cent of residents are considered low income. More than two-thirds of the people here were born in Alberta, while seven per cent are immigrants. People of German origin make up nine per cent of the population. More than 96 per cent say their language at home is English, the second-highest rate in Alberta (2001 census).  In 2021, National Post columnist Colby Cosh said that the district "might be the single most truculently conservative anywhere" in Canada.

History
The electoral district was created in the 1996 electoral boundary re-distribution from the old electoral districts of Olds-Didsbury and Three Hills-Airdrie.

In the 2004 electoral boundary re-distribution the boundaries changed somewhat, with an agricultural section in the far west transferred to Banff-Cochrane, while in the southeast a section of the old Drumheller-Chinook riding - including the community of Carbon - was added. Major communities include Olds, Didsbury, Carstairs, Trochu and Three Hills, as well as Olds College. It covers Kneehill County and most of Mountain View County.

The 2010 electoral boundary re-distribution saw the district absorb the northern portions of Airdrie-Chestermere and Foothills-Rocky View which were both abolished and it lost some land on the eastern boundary to Drumheller-Stettler.

The 2017 electoral boundary re-distribution resulted in the expansion of the Olds-Didsbury-Three Hills electoral district to include the northern portion of Wheatland County, formerly part of the Strathmore-Brooks constituency. The resulting population of the district in 2017 was 49,418, 6% above the provincial average population of 46,803.

Boundary history

Representation history

Right-leaning parties have fared well in this riding. Richard Marz, the incumbent, has been the riding's only representative since it was founded. In his first election win in 1997, the runner-up was Social Credit candidate Don MacDonald who had previously served as an MLA under the Liberal banner in the Legislative Assembly from 1992-1993.

Marz achieved a landslide running for his second term in the 2001 election taking over 80% of the popular vote. The 2004 election saw the Alliance Party in a distant second with 16.5%.  The 2008 election resulted with Marz increasing his votes by 4.66% over the 2004 results. The Alliance Party changed names to the Wildrose Alliance Party and remained well behind with only 21.03% of the vote. Marz vacated the seat ahead of the 2012 general election on March 16, 2012. Wildrose candidate Bruce Rowe was elected in the 2012 provincial election.

Legislature results

1997 general election

2001 general election

2004 general election

2008 general election

2012 general election

2015 general election

2019 general election

Senate nominee results

2004 Senate nominee election district results
Voters had the option of selecting 4 Candidates on the Ballot

2012 Senate nominee election district results

Student Vote

2004 election

On November 19, 2004 a Student Vote was conducted at participating Alberta schools to parallel the 2004 Alberta general election results. The vote was designed to educate students and simulate the electoral process for persons who have not yet reached the legal majority. The vote was conducted in 80 of the 83 provincial electoral districts with students voting for actual election candidates. Schools with a large student body that reside in another electoral district had the option to vote for candidates outside of the electoral district then where they were physically located.

2012 election

See also
List of Alberta provincial electoral districts

References

External links
Elections Alberta
The Legislative Assembly of Alberta

Alberta provincial electoral districts